Oppositions was an architectural journal produced by the Institute for Architecture and Urban Studies from 1973 to 1984. Many of its articles contributed to advancing architectural theory and many of its contributors became distinguished practitioners in the field of architecture. Twenty-six issues were produced during its eleven years of existence.

Oppositions was edited by Peter Eisenmann (1-25), Kenneth Frampton (1-25), Mario Gandelsonas (1-26), Anthony Vidler (6-26), Kurt W. Forster (12-25), and Diana Agrest (26). Contributors included: Diana Agrest, Stanford Anderson, Giorgio Ciucci, Stuart Cohen, Alan Colquhoun, Francesco Dal Co, Peter Eisenman, William Ellis, Kurt W. Forster, Kenneth Frampton, Mario Gandelsonas, Giorgio Grassi, Fred Koetter, Rem Koolhaas, Léon Krier, Mary McLeod, Rafael Moneo, Joan Ockman, Martin Pawley, Aldo Rossi, Colin Rowe, Denise Scott Brown, Jorge Silvetti, Ignasi de Solà-Morales, Manfredo Tafuri, Bernard Tschumi, Anthony Vidler, and Hajime Yatsuka.

The journal was designed by Massimo Vignelli.

Notes

References

External links
Finding aid for the Institute for Architecture and Urban Studies fonds, Sub-Series: Periodicals, Canadian Centre for Architecture (digitized items)
Initial dummy for the first issue of Oppositions (1973), Canadian Centre for Architecture 
Oppositions, 1-25 (September 1973 - Fall 1982), table of contents and covers
Oppositions, 1-26 (September 1973 - Spring 1984), contents by author
Oppositions, 1-26 (September 1973 - Spring 1984), covers 
Oppositions Reader, ed. by Michael K. Hays (1998), table of contents

Architectural theory
Architecture journals